Isairis Isabel Minaya Ramos (born 27 October 1992) is a Dominican football manager and a retired footballer who played as a goalkeeper. She has been a member of the Dominican Republic women's national team.

Early life
Minaya hails from San Francisco de Macorís.

International career
Minaya represented the Dominican Republic at the 2012 CONCACAF Women's U-20 Championship qualifying. At senior level, she capped during the 2010 CONCACAF Women's World Cup Qualifying qualification and the 2014 Central American and Caribbean Games.

References 

1992 births
Living people
Women's association football goalkeepers
Dominican Republic women's footballers
People from San Francisco de Macorís
Dominican Republic women's international footballers
Competitors at the 2014 Central American and Caribbean Games
Dominican Republic football managers
Female association football managers